A destructive, two-day tornado outbreak affected the Great Lakes region of the United States and the National Capital Region of Canada in late-September. A total of 37 tornadoes were confirmed, including a long-tracked EF3 tornado that moved along a  path from near Dunrobin, Ontario to Gatineau, Quebec, and an EF2 tornado in the Nepean sector of Ottawa. The tornadoes in Ottawa-Gatineau were declared one of the ten most significant weather events of 2018 in Canada by the Meteorological Service of Canada.

Numerous tornadoes touched down in Minnesota on the initial day of the outbreak, including a high-end EF2 tornado that caused major damage in Morristown, Minnesota. Other damage occurred in Eastern Ontario due to downburst winds from the severe thunderstorms. One death was reported as a result of straight-line winds that occurred during the outbreak, and 31 people were injured.

Meteorological synopsis
In the Great Lakes region of the United States, a warm front surged in a hot, unstable air mass ahead of a strong cold front on September 20. An enhanced risk of severe weather was issued by the Storm Prediction Center (SPC), including a 10% hatched risk area for tornadoes stretching from southern Minnesota into Wisconsin. Later that evening, a quasi-linear convective system with numerous embedded circulations and bowing line segments produced many tornadoes across southern Minnesota. This included a high-end EF2 tornado that heavily damaged or destroyed many homes in the town of Morristown, Minnesota. Another EF2 tornado damaged the local airport in Faribault. A few tornadoes were also confirmed in Iowa, Wisconsin, and Ohio, and damaging winds from the line of storms also caused significant damage. Embedded downbursts produced destructive straight-line winds of up to  during the event. With 25 tornadoes in a matter of hours, this event was Minnesota's third most prolific tornado day on record.

The severe weather threat was expected to move eastward to affect southern Ontario and a part of southwestern Quebec the next day. On September 21, a significant severe weather threat was confirmed across southern Ontario and the Outaouais region of Quebec, with the potential for severe thunderstorms and tornadoes noted.

Severe thunderstorm watches and warnings along with wind warnings and special weather statements were issued across parts of Ontario as early as the pre-dawn hours of September 21, which remained in effect until that evening. The warm humid air mass reached Ontario that morning of September 21, along with localized thunderstorms with heavy torrential downpours in most of the areas across southern Ontario and again later that day during the tornado outbreak. Record breaking temperatures across southern Ontario ranged from the high 20s into the low 30s.  
Tornado watches and warnings were issued by that afternoon. 

On the afternoon of September 21, 2018, a localized outbreak of tornadoes impacted eastern Ontario and southern Quebec. During the event, Environment Canada issued numerous tornado warnings as multiple discrete tornadic supercells moved through the area. Between 3:30 p.m. and 6:30 p.m. EDT, seven tornadoes, six of which were strong, caused severe damage in and around the National Capital Region of Canada.

The most significant tornado of the event made a direct strike on the small community of Dunrobin in the west end of Ottawa, then crossed the Ottawa River and struck the residential part of Breckenridge, continued through the northern part of Aylmer, then struck the Mont-Bleu residential area in the Hull sector of Gatineau, Quebec. The Dunrobin-Gatineau tornado was classified as a high-end, long-tracked EF3 tornado, with peak winds reaching . Approximately 25 people were injured by the EF3 tornado, six of those taken to the hospital and five people had life-threatening injuries. At least 200 buildings were damaged and an unknown number were destroyed along the path. During the event, the long-tracked EF3 tornado that struck Dunrobin and Gatineau was visible on the horizon behind the Parliament Hill buildings in Ottawa. A still image of the funnel was also captured from a live webcam.

A second damaging tornado, rated EF2, caused significant damage in the Arlington Woods, Craig Henry, and Merivale Road residential areas of Nepean, with peak winds of  The tornadoes were preceded by severe thunderstorms throughout Ontario and Quebec. Five other tornadoes also caused minor to moderate damage in the region, though they remained over remote forested areas and mostly damaged trees and power lines.

The severe weather threat then diminished by late Friday evening, with cool windy conditions.

Confirmed tornadoes

September 20 event

September 21 event

Aftermath 
Damage from the tornadoes caused more than 272,000 customers of the National Capital Region to lose power, with some of the outages lasting for days. In addition to the tornadoes, microbursts and hail from the severe thunderstorms also caused considerable damage across Ontario and Quebec. 

Most of the severely damaged buildings that remained intact after the tornado were under repair. The Dunrobin Plaza shopping centre, which was severely damaged by the tornado, was demolished in December 2018, more than two months after the tornado.   In October 2018, a month after the storm, it was announced that the September 21 tornadoes caused a massive $295 million in insurance costs, making it one of 2018's costliest storms in Ontario.     

The Dunrobin-Gatineau EF3 tornado was the strongest to hit eastern Ontario since 1902.  The last time an EF3 tornado occurred in Ontario prior to this event was the Goderich tornado in August 2011. One non-tornadic death occurred as a result of this severe weather outbreak. The fatality was reported in the township of Rideau Lakes, Ontario, after a man was struck by a falling tree after being caught in straight-line winds.

The National Capital Region power outages 
One of the sites that was affected by the Arlington Woods EF2 tornado was the Merivale electrical substation, one of the two major stations in the city, located near the intersection of Merivale and Hunt Club Road in western Ottawa. While there is no proof confirming whether or not the tornado directly struck the station, it did rip off the roof of two nearby buildings, slamming into the infrastructure, insulators, and wires. 
Furthermore, the effects of the storm snapped approximately 80 to 90 Hydro poles in the area, downing many others, and leaving pole and wires dangling.

This was the main reason for the longest power outages in the Ottawa-Gatineau region, affecting more than 300,000 customers of the 331,777 total customers who use Hydro Ottawa, plus those served on the Quebec side by Hydro-Québec. Rebuilding the power plant was especially difficult, which took Hydro One and Hydro Ottawa two days working to repair enough of the damage to restore power. Finally, on the evening of September 22, power was restored in some neighbourhoods in southwestern Ottawa. Repair of the downed poles was done as fast as possible, as to restore heat and power as well in several residences.

Although electricity had been restored, the power plant had still required additional repairs, and Hydro One continued working on critical repairs to the station in order to return it to its full potential state. Planned power outages around the city affected more than 50,000 Hydro One and Hydro Ottawa customers to replace important elements. Work at the Merivale station was expected to last for several months.

The Ottawa Macdonald–Cartier International Airport was forced to use backup power during the storms. No damage was reported at the airport.

See also
List of tornadoes and tornado outbreaks
List of North American tornadoes and tornado outbreaks
List of 21st-century Canadian tornadoes and tornado outbreaks
1953 Sarnia tornado outbreak
1985 United States–Canada tornado outbreak
List of tornadoes in the 1985 United States–Canada tornado outbreak
1997 Southeast Michigan tornado outbreak

Notes

References

2018-09-21
2010s in Ottawa
2018 in Ontario
2018 in Quebec
2018 disasters in Canada
Disasters in Quebec
Disasters in Ontario
Disasters in Ottawa
September 2018 events in North America
History of Gatineau
Tornadoes in Ontario
Tornadoes in Quebec
F3 tornadoes
Tornadoes of 2018